Togha Temür (died December 1353), also known as Taghaytimur, was a claimant to the throne of the Ilkhanate in the mid-14th century. Of the many individuals who attempted to become Ilkhan after the death of Abu Sa'id, Togha Temür was the only one who hailed from eastern Iran, and was the last major candidate who was of the house of Genghis Khan. His base of power was Gurgan and western Khurasan. His name "Togoy Tomor" means "Bowl/Pot Iron" in the Mongolian language.

Before the death of Abu Sa'id

Togha Temür descended from Hasar, Genghis Khan's brother. Eventually, his family became the rulers of a nomadic tribe, the Chete. His grandfather Baba Kawun had moved the Chete into the region between Astarabad (modern-day Gurgan) and Kalbush on the east Gurgan River. This region's principal cities were Astarabad and Jurjan. When Togha Temür became the leader of the Chete, they were still in this area.

Struggles with the Jalayirids and Chobanids

A few months after the death of Ilkhan Abu Sa'id in 1335, Togha Temür became involved in the succession struggle. The governor of Khurasan, Shaikh 'Ali b. 'Ali Qushji, noting Togha Temür's relation to Chinngis Khan, proposed naming him Ilkhan, and most of the princes of eastern Iran were convinced to accept him as sovereign. After his name was added to the coinage and in the official prayers, an expedition into western Iran was planned. In that part of the country two Ilkhans, Arpa Ke'un and Musa Khan, had already been overthrown, and it was believed that the troops of Khurasan could overcome the instability there.

In the spring of 1337 Togha Temür's forces began the campaign. There was dissension within his ranks, however; several local princes resented the power of Shaikh 'Ali over the would-be Ilkhan, and hated the economic policies that he had been in charge of implementing as governor of Khurasan. As a result, two of his supporters, namely Arghun Shah, who was chief of the Jauni Kurban tribe, and 'Abd-Allah b. Mulai, who held Kuhistan, withdrew from the campaign at Bistam. This was offset by the addition of the former Ilkhan Musa Khan and his troops, who had been in flight since their defeat by the Jalayirid Hasan Buzurg and his puppet khan, Muhammad Khan. Together they occupied the old Ilkhan capital Soltaniyeh, but in June 1337 Hasan Buzurg met and defeated them on the field, forcing Togha Temür and Shaikh 'Ali to evacuate the region.

In July 1337, while returning to Khurasan, Shaikh 'Ali was captured by Arghun Shah, who executed him and sent his head to Hasan Buzurg. From this point on Arghun Shah was Togha Temür's most powerful supporter. He convinced Togha Temür to resist Muhammad-i Mulai, who arrived in Khurasan to act as Hasan Buzurg's governor there. Togha Temür and Arghun Shah defeated and executed him in the fall of that year, making sure that Khurasan remained free of the Jalayirids.

Less than a year later, Togha Temür was again drawn into events in the west. Hasan Buzurg's rule there had been contested by the Chobanid Hasan Kucek, who had defeated the Jalayirids, killed Hasan Buzurg's puppet khan, and taken control of Tabriz in July 1338. In response, Hasan Buzurg requested the assistance of Togha Temür. After consulting Arghun Shah, he accepted, and in 1339 he returned to western Iran. As part of the deal, Hasan Buzurg recognized him as Ilkhan.

Hasan Kucek, however, acted quickly to destroy the alliance. He sent a letter to Togha Temür, offering him the hand of his own Ilkhan puppet, Sati Beg, in marriage with the prospect of an alliance between the Chobanids and Khurasanis. Togha Temür was pleased with the idea, so he sent a response accepting the offer. Hasan Kucek then forwarded the response to Hasan Buzurg with a supplementary letter warning him that Togha Temür was an untrustworthy person and claiming that the Jalayirids and Chobanids believed in many of the same things and could together work towards the reunification of the Ilkhanid state.

Hasan Buzurg, believing his Chobanid rival, decided to turn against the Khurasanis. With both Jalayirid and Chobanid forces opposing him, Togha Temür had little choice but to return to Khurasan. Although in 1340 Togha Temür was again recognized by Hasan Buzurg as Ilkhan, and continued to be recognized as such until 1344, his attempts to unify the Ilkhanate under his rule had effectively failed. The regular Khurasani army had been decimated, leaving Togha Temür dependent on his and his allies' tribal forces, which were insufficient to conquer the west.

Conflict with the Sarbadars

In the west the Jalayirids and Chobanids had prevented Togha Temür from extending his rule across much of the Ilkhanate. Another group opposed him much more directly - they threatened his rule in Khurasan itself. The Sarbadars came to power by revolting against one of Togha Temür's subordinates, 'Ala' al-Din Muhammad, as a result of increasingly harsh tax demands. Initially the Sarbadars claimed that their revolt was against 'Ala' al-Din only and not against Togha Temür, and continued to put Togha Temür's name on their coins. When they attacked Arghun Shah's Jauni Kurban, however, Togha Temür was prompted to send his forces against them, but they were defeated and both 'Ala' al-Din and 'Abd-Allah b. Mulai were killed. Following this, the Sarbadars took much of Khurasan and transferred their allegiance to the Chobanids, recognizing Hasan Kucek's puppet khan Suleiman Khan.

Togha Temür and his supporters fled to the Jajrud valley, to the south of Amol (in Mazandaran), whose ruler, the Bavandid Hasan II, was his vassal. In 1344 the Sarbadars decided to wipe out Togha Temür and moved against him, but the Bavandids trapped their army and killed their leader, Mas'ud. This allowed Togha Temür to reclaim much of the territory the Sarbadars had captured, and he even briefly regained their allegiance.

Despite this, the Sarbadars continued to pose a problem. Togha Temür was not helped by the death of Arghun Shah, who died in 1345 or 1346, after which the Jauni Kurban ceased to support him against the Sarbadars. Fighting between the two sides continued until Yahya Karawi took control of the Sarbadars in around 1352. He decided to submit to Togha Temür, minted coins in his name, sent him tribute, and promised to present himself before the khan every year. Togha Temür accepted this proposal, and it seemed like peace had been achieved. However, Yahya did not intend to remain Togha Temür's vassal. In November or December 1353 Yahya and a group of Sarbadars presented themselves before Togha Temür in his camp. They struck him down, then slaughtered his family and his army and killed the nomads' animals.

Much of Togha Temür's territories then passed into the Sarbadars' hands again. The remaining lands were supposed to fall into his son Luqman's hands, but Amir Vali, the son of Togha Temür's governor of Astarabad, set him aside; it was he who continued the struggle with the Sarbadars.

References

Jackson, Peter. The Cambridge History of Iran, Volume Six: The Timurid and Safavid Periods. Cambridge University Press, 1968. 
Smith, Jr., John Masson. The History of the Sarbadar Dynasty 1336-1381 A.D. and Its Sources. The Hague: Mouton, 1970. 

1353 deaths
Il-Khan emperors
14th-century monarchs in Asia
Year of birth unknown